The Assembly of European Wine Regions or Assemblée des Régions Européennes Viticoles (AREV) is an organisation of political and professionals representatives of wine regions within the European Union (EU) and Eastern Europe. It lobbies the EU on matters affecting its members, and acts as a forum for discussion of policy and marketing.

History
The European Wine Regions Conference (CERV) was created on 20 June 1988 under Alsatian law. It became the Assembly of European Wine Regions (AREV) in 1994. It is financed by membership subscriptions, and is based in Bordeaux with an office in Strasbourg. The industry representatives are grouped together in the European Wine Trade Council (CEPV), which drafts documents to be approved by the plenary council.

Members 
Alentejo, Alsace, Aquitaine, Arad, Aragón, Bács-Kiskun, Baden-Württemberg, Baranya, Bavaria, Borsod-Abaúj-Zemplén, Burgundy, Burgenland, Castilla-La-Mancha, Castilla y León, Catalonia, Centre, Champagne-Ardenne, Constanta, Extremadura, Euskadi, Franche-Comté, Friuli-Venezia-Giulia, Galicia, Hesse, Languedoc-Roussillon, La Rioja, Liguria, Lombardia, Macedonia, Madeira, Madrid, Midi-Pyrénées, Murcia, Navarra, Niederösterreich, Norte, Odessa oblast, Os Açores, Pays de Loire, Piedmont, Provence-Alpes-Côte d'Azur, Rhineland-Palatinate, Rhône-Alpes, Sicily, Slovenia, Steiermark, The Czech Republic, Tolna, Trento, Valais, Valencia, Valle d'Aosta, Veneto.

Meetings 

Jun 20–21, 1988 - Aquitaine - Bourg s/Gironde – 1st Plenary Session
May 23, 1989 - Baden-Württemberg - Stuttgart – International Council
Nov 05–07, 1990 - Baden-Württemberg - Freiburg im Breisgau - Plenary Session
Oct 21–23, 1991 - Catalunya - Vilafranca del Penedès – Plenary Session
Apr 22–23, 1992 - Andalucía - Jerez de la Frontera – 1st World Assembly
Nov 22–23, 1993 - Languedoc - Roussillon - Montpellier - Plenary Session - International Bureau - Steering Committee n° 3
Oct 26, 1994 - Sicily - Marsala - Ist International Council – Regions information meeting (Dyonisos)
Feb 23, 1995 - La Rioja - Logroño - II International Council - International Bureau
Sep18-19, 1995 - Rheinland-Pfalz - Mainz - III International Council
Nov 06–07, 1995 - Steiermark - Graz - II Plenary Session - International Bureau
May 6, 1996 - Languedoc-Roussillon - Montpellier - IV International Council - International Bureau
Sep 04–08, 1996 - Baranya - Pécs - III Plenary Session - International Bureau
Apr 07–08, 1997 - Norte - Porto - V International Council
Jun 13–14, 1997 - Aquitaine - Bordeaux - IV Plenary Session - International Bureau
Nov 21–22, 1997 - Valenciana - Valencia - VI International Council
May 13–16, 1998 - Baden-Württemberg - Stuttgart - Extraordinary session - V Plenary Session - International Bureau - VII International Council
Sep 08–11, 1998 - Alentejo - Evora - VI Plenary Session - International Bureau
Apr 14–16, 1999 - Castilla-La Mancha - Toledo – VII Plenary Session - International Bureau - VIII International Council
Oct 14–16, 1999 - Piedmont - Turin - IX International Council - International Bureau
May 18–22, 2000 - Central Macedonia - Thessaloniki - VIII Plenary Session
Oct 26–28, 2000 – Burgundy – Dijon - X International Council
May 20–22, 2001 - La Rioja - Logroño - IX Plenary Session - International Bureau – XI International Council
Sep 08, 2001 - Madrid - Madrid - XII International Council
Nov 8-10 2001 - Aosta Valley - Courmayeur – XIII International Council
May 16–18, 2002 - Baranya & Tolna - Pécs/Szekszárd - X Plenary Session - International Bureau - XIV International Council
Jan 16–19, 2003 - Sicily - Catania - XV International Council - International Bureau
Jun 02–03, 2003 - Languedoc-Roussillon - Montpellier - XI Plenary Session - International Bureau
Nov 06–09, 2003 - Hessen - Wiesbaden - XVI International Council
Apr 22–24, 2004 - Norte - Porto - XII Plenary Session - XVII International Council
Jun 09–11, 2005 - Aosta Valley - Aosta - XIII Plenary Session, Extraordinary Plenary session, XVIII International Council
Apr 07–09, 2006 - South Tyrol – Merano - XIV Plenary Session - XIX International Council
Jul 27–28, 2006 - Czech Republic - Brno - XX International Council
Apr 20–21, 2007 - Baden-Württemberg - Stuttgart - XV Plenary Session and XXI International Council
Sept 03–05, 2007 - Romania - Alba Iulia - 22nd International Council
May 30, 2007 - Reims - Champagne-Ardenne - Plenary Session
Nov 5, 2008 - Mainz – Rhineland Palatinate - International Bureau
Jun 19, 2009 - Evora - Alentejo - Plenary Session
May 28, 2010 - Poreč - Istrie/Croatie - Plenary Session
Apr 29–30, 2011 - Castilla-La Mancha - Toledo -  Plenary Session
Jun 26-28, 2018 - Niederösterreich - Hainburg-an-der-Donau - Plenary Session
Jun 11-13, 2019 - Açores - Horta - XXVII Plenary Session
Nov 26, 2020 - Online (due to the COVID19) - XXVIII Plenary Session
Jun 21-22, 2022 - Baden-Württemberg - Heilbronn - XXIX Plenary Session

Debates on genetically modified organisms and on the Common Organization of the Market for Wine (COM Wine). AREV is against the COM.

References

External links
 Map of AREV members

Wine industry organizations
Wine regions